Jofegan, California is an abandoned settlement pre-dating the O'Neill Ranch at the center of the Marine Corps Base Camp Pendleton in San Diego County, California, United States. It is adjacent to an out-of-use railroad to the West of Vandegrift Boulevard, and South of Lake O'Neill. 

Geography of San Diego County, California